Matthew Williamson (born 23 October 1971) is an interior designer known for his use of bold, colourful and carefully constructed designs.

Early years
Matthew Williamson was born in Manchester and studied in Loreto College until he was 17 years old. He then moved to London to attend school at Central Saint Martin's College of Art and Design, graduating in 1994.

Career
His eponymous fashion house was founded in February 1997. The same year, he debuted his collection 'Electric Angels' at London Fashion Week. His collections were displayed during New York Fashion week in 2002. His store at 28 Bruton Street, in Mayfair, London, followed in 2004. In 2005, he launched his perfume range and the following year he was appointed Creative Director at Emilio Pucci. In 2007, a runway show of his designs was incorporated into the video for Prince's song "Chelsea Rodgers" from his Planet Earth album. In 2007, the Design Museum, London, hosted a retrospective of his work entitled "Matthew Williamson – 10 years in Fashion".

In 2008, Williamson was awarded the "Red Carpet Designer" accolade at the British Fashion Awards, where he has also received three nominations for Designer of the Year. In September 2008, Williamson returned to London full-time to focus fully on his own label's forthcoming ventures and expansion. He made a guest appearance on season 7 of Project Runway. The episode aired on 28 January 2010.

In Autumn 2010, a self-titled book was published by Rizzoli. The book is written by Colin McDowell with a foreword by Sienna Miller, and contributions from Anna Wintour, Alexandra Shulman and Diane von Fürstenberg. An accompanying photographic exhibition marked the book launch at Somerset House.

September 2012 marked the 15th anniversary of Williamson's career. To commemorate the occasion, a short film was commissioned in association with Swarovski. The film, titled XV, stars friends of the brand including Sienna Miller, Andrea Riseborough and Poppy Delevingne. It was showcased exclusively on Net-a-Porter.com alongside a limited edition Swarovski collection of crystal dresses.

Williamson then expanded into the home and lifestyle sectors. 2013 saw the launch of his collaboration with Osborne & Little on a range of home furnishing fabrics and wallpapers. The second collection was released in 2014, titled 'Samana', and the third in 2015, titled 'Cubana'. In 2016, Williamson collaborated with Duresta to launch his first furniture collection, as well as cards, stationery and a designer colouring book featuring notable prints from the designer's previous fashion collections. In October 2016, Williamson launched a collaboration with United States homeware brand CB2, a division of Crate & Barrel.

In 2019, Williamson was the guest judge on episode 1 of the first series of Interior Design Masters, which aired on 14 August 2019 on BBC Two. He returned in the eighth week to help judge the final, alongside fellow guest judge Naomi Cleaver. Matthew is a continuing guest judge on the competition series, offering advice and appraisal to designers looking for their big break. Matthew will be returning to judge season 4 which airs in spring 2023. 

In 2022, Matthew launched a homeware collection for John Lewis. The range is characterised by his signature bold colours and maximalist botanical wallpapers, bedding, cushions, and towels alongside mirrors, lighting, and candles. Matthew’s collaboration is the biggest of its kind for the department store chain and will be ongoing, with a new collection to launch in 2023. 

Additionally in 2022, Matthew designed The Cocktail Club’s Birmingham location which is the bar’s biggest site to date. The cocktail bar’s decadent interior highlight’s Matthew’s distinct use of pattern and colour through the inclusion of leopard print sofas, gold leaf ceiling hangings, and a 1970s London Zoo cheetah centrepiece.

References

External links

BBC Blast – Matthew Williamson
Matthew Williamson @ Bartolomy

1971 births
Alumni of Central Saint Martins
British fashion designers
LGBT fashion designers
High fashion brands
Living people
People from Chorlton-cum-Hardy